Ivan Vekić (18 October 1938 – 17 December 2014) was a Croatian politician and lawyer. He was one of the founders of the Croatian Democratic Union and served as the Croatian Minister of Interior during the Croatian War of Independence.

Biography 
Vekić was born in Poljica near Vrgorac in Kingdom of Yugoslavia on 18 October 1938. He was a member of Matica hrvatska and was one of the founders of the Croatian Democratic Union in 1989. In 1990 he entered the Croatian Parliament. He served as the Minister of Interior from 31 July 1991 until 15 April 1992. During the Croatian War of Independence he had a rank of Colonel. He was decorated with the Order of Ante Starčević for contribution to the maintenance and development of the Croatian statehood idea, establishment and construction of the sovereign Croatian state, while he refused to accept 5 decorations which were awarded to him by President Franjo Tuđman.

Vekić is a critic of post-war policy of Croatian Democratic Union. He entered a conflict with the party's new leaders, Ivo Sanader and Vladimir Šeks. In 2003, after publishing Steps in History - Memories and Events, where he criticized Šeks, he was expelled from the party.

During the parliamentary election in 2007, he was a candidate of Only Croatia – Movement for Croatia for a seat in the Parliament.

In May 2011, after a series of adverse events in Croatia, he reshaped his existing civic association "Croatian Guard" into a nationalist political party called the Croatian Guard National Party. He is the President of the party, and they advocate armed training in high schools and capital punishment.

In September 2011 he was accused for war crimes by Serbia, along with Vladimir Šeks, Branimir Glavaš, Tomislav Merčep and 40 other Croatian soldiers involved in the Battle of Vukovar. He is charged with killing of 13 civilians and 6 unidentified persons.

In October 2011 he entered into a coalition with the Croatian Party of Rights. This was a result of call for unity of right-wing parties made by Daniel Srb, president of the Croatian Party of Rights. Vekić was the top candidate on this coalition's list in the 4th electoral district in the 2011 Croatian parliamentary election. The list won 4.69% of the vote and failed to enter parliament.

References

1938 births
2014 deaths
People from Vrgorac
Croatian army officers
Politicians of the Croatian War of Independence
Interior ministers of Croatia
Representatives in the modern Croatian Parliament
Order of Ante Starčević recipients
Croatian Democratic Union politicians
Croatian independence activists